Nick Pope is a freelance British journalist, media commentator and former civil servant. Whilst an employee at the British Government's Ministry of Defence (MoD), Pope was responsible, among other duties, for investigating UFO phenomena to determine if they had any defence significance.

He moved to the United States in January 2012.

Ministry of Defence
Pope worked as a civil servant for the Ministry of Defence from 1985 to 2006. From 1991 to 1994, he worked in Secretariat (Air Staff) Sec (AS) 2a more commonly known as the "UFO desk", where his duties included investigating reports of UFO sightings, to see if they had any defence significance. 
At the time, while the Ministry of Defence stated that it "remains totally open-minded about the existence or otherwise of extraterrestrial lifeforms", it also stated that there was no evidence to suggest that any UFO sightings posed any threat to the UK or that they were extraterrestrial in origin. It is clear from material that Pope wrote whilst still at the MoD that he did not share the MoD's view that conventional explanations could be found for all UFO sightings.

Pope's final posting in the MoD was to the Directorate of Defence Security.  In 2009, MoD announced that UFO sightings would no longer be investigated.

Media work
In November 2006, Mr. Pope stated that the government's "X-Files have been closed down". He continues his research and investigation in a private capacity and now works as a freelance journalist and media commentator, covering subjects that include the unexplained, conspiracy theories, space, science fiction and fringe science.

He does work for a number of film companies and PR agencies, promoting the release of science fiction films.

On 24 June 2013, he appeared on IGN's comedy show Up at Noon promoting the game The Bureau: XCOM Declassified.

In 2015, he appeared in multiple episodes of UFOs Declassified, airing on Canada's History Television, the UK's Yesterday, and Smithsonian Channel in the US. Since 2019,  he has often appeared on the New York Post UFO YouTube series The Basement Office alongside journalist Steven Greenstreet.

Books
Open Skies, Closed Minds is Pope's autobiographical account of his interest in ufology.  It provides an overview of the UFO phenomenon, with the emphasis on Pope's three-year tour of duty at the Ministry of Defence where his responsibilities included investigating UFO sightings and any impact they might have on UK national defense. Pope also discusses the politics surrounding the way in which those within government and the military view UFO-phenomena. In 1997, he released a second book on similar themes entitled The Uninvited. His book Encounter in Rendlesham Forest: The Inside Story of the World's Best-Documented UFO Incident, written with John Burroughs, USAF, Ret., and Jim Penniston, USAF, Ret., was published by Thomas Dunne Books in April 2014.

Pope has also written two science fiction novels, Operation Thunder Child and its sequel Operation Lightning Strike. In 2018, Pope published the political thriller Blood Brothers.

Journalism
Pope also writes for online alternative news site Neon Nettle in which he talks about current topics and news as well as UFO based material on the site fortnightly column.

References

External links

2009 Interview (1hr 20 mins).
My time as a UFO investigator for the government  bbc.com

Ufologists
UFO writers
British writers
Living people
English civil servants
British journalists
Year of birth missing (living people)